Notharchus is a genus of puffbird in the Bucconidae family.

The genus was introduced by the German ornithologists Jean Cabanis and Ferdinand Heine in 1863. The type species was subsequently designated as the white-necked puffbird (Notharchus hyperrhynchus) by the English zoologist Philip Sclater in 1882. The generic name combines the Ancient Greek nōthēs meaning "sluggish" and arkhos meaning "leader" or "chief".

The genus contains six species:

References

 
Bird genera
Taxonomy articles created by Polbot